Karl Gerhard Lindblom (26 August 1887 – 8 June 1969) was an ethnographer from Sweden who worked in East Africa in the 1910s.  He was the principal author of materials on the Akamba peoples. Additionally, he worked as the Director of the Museum of Stockholm beginning in 1928 and in 1935 he became a professor at the University of Stockholm.

Bibliography 
Outlines of a Tharaka Grammar, with a list of words and specimens of the language, 1914
The Akamba in British East Africa : an ethnological monograph, 1916, PhD dissertation at Uppsala University, Sweden, 2nd edition, enlarged, 1918–1920, facsimile 1969
Notes on Kamba grammar : with two appendices: Kamba names of persons, places, animals and plants - salutations, 1926
Die Beschneidung bei den Akamba, 1927
Die Schleuder in Afrika und Anderwärts, 1927
Fighting-bracelets and Kindred Weapons in Africa, 1927
The Use of Stilts : especially in Africa and America, 1927
Further notes on the use of stilts, 1928
Kamba folklore, 3 volumes, 1928-1935
String figures in Africa, 1930
The use of oxen as pack riding animals in Africa, 1931
Notes ethnographiques sur le Kavirondo septentrional et la colonie du Kenya, 1932
Spears and staffs with two or more points, in Africa, 1937
Wire-drawing, especially in Africa, 1939
Ethnological and anthropological studies in Sweden during the war, 1946

References

1887 births
1969 deaths
Swedish ethnographers
Uppsala University alumni
Expatriates from Sweden in British East Africa